The Bodyguard is a 1992 American romantic drama thriller film directed by Mick Jackson, written by Lawrence Kasdan, and starring Kevin Costner, Whitney Houston (in her acting debut), Gary Kemp, Bill Cobbs, and Ralph Waite. The film follows a former United States Secret Service agent turned bodyguard who is hired to protect a famous actress and singer from an unknown stalker. Kasdan wrote the film in the mid-1970s, originally as a vehicle for Steve McQueen and Diana Ross.

The Bodyguard was theatrically released by Warner Bros. Pictures on November 25, 1992. The film grossed $411 million worldwide, becoming the second highest-grossing film of 1992 behind Aladdin and at the time of its release the tenth highest-grossing film of all time. However, the film received generally negative reviews by critics who criticized its screenplay and performances of the lead actors. The film's accompanying soundtrack by Houston became the best-selling soundtrack album of all-time, with sales of over 45 million copies worldwide, and won the Grammy Award for Album of the Year, while the singles "I Have Nothing" and "Run to You" received nominations for the Academy Award for Best Original Song. The film received seven nominations at the 13th Golden Raspberry Awards, including for Worst Picture, Worst Actor (for Costner) and Worst Actress (for Houston).

Plot
Rachel Marron is an Academy Award-nominated actress and music superstar who is being sent death threats by a stalker. After a bomb explodes in her dressing room, her manager Bill Devaney seeks out professional bodyguard Frank Farmer, a former Secret Service agent who served on the Carter and Reagan presidential details, to protect her. Frank reluctantly accepts Devaney's offer, but he feels Rachel is a spoiled diva who is oblivious to the threats against her life.

Rachel soon accuses Frank of being paranoid, complaining that his extensive protection techniques are intrusive. However, Frank and Rachel grow closer when he rescues her from danger after a riot erupts at one of her concerts. Her existing bodyguard, Tony, resents Frank's presence, leading to a brawl between the two in Rachel's kitchen. Though Frank tries to remain professional, he and Rachel sleep together; he breaks off the affair the next day, realizing it compromises his ability to protect her. Hurt, Rachel begins to defy Frank's security measures.  Then, to make Frank jealous, Rachel flirts with his former Secret Service colleague, Greg Portman, whom she meets at a Miami party.

When her stalker places a threatening phone call, Rachel finally recognizes the seriousness of the situation and her need to trust Frank completely. Frank, Rachel, her son Fletcher, her older sister Nicki, and her driver, Henry, then travel to a large lakefront cabin in the mountains, the home of Frank's father, Herb. The next day, Frank rescues Fletcher from a small motorboat just before it explodes. After Frank secures the house for the night, a drunk Nicki, upset that Fletcher could have died, admits to Frank that she hired a hitman to kill Rachel during a fit of jealousy, but that the letters from the stalker came before that. She has paid in full and does not know the killer's identity. Abruptly, the hitman breaks into the dark house and fatally shoots Nicki. Frank pursues the killer into the woods; he shoots at the assailant, misses, and the assailant escapes. Frank learns that the stalker had been apprehended earlier that day, and was in custody when Nicki was killed.

A few days after Nicki's funeral is the Academy Awards ceremony, where Frank gives Rachel a panic button in the shape of a cross to immediately alert him to any trouble. Despite this, a plethora of backstage technical issues hamper Frank's efforts to monitor the proceedings closely. While presenting an award, Rachel freezes and runs offstage, angry at Frank for embarrassing her with overprotective measures. Later, Rachel is announced as the winner for Best Actress, but as she comes on stage to accept the award, Portman is revealed to be the hitman, masquerading as the bodyguard for the ceremony's host. Frank notices Portman pointing a gun disguised as a camera at Rachel; as Portman prepares for the fatal shot, Frank runs onstage and leaps in front of Rachel, taking the bullet meant for her and setting off chaos amongst the audience. Immediately regaining his balance, Frank shoots and kills Portman when he targets Rachel again. Frank is left wounded, and Rachel calls for help, all the while urging him to stay with her as he slowly passes out.

Frank recovers from the shooting and bids farewell to Rachel at the airport, both knowing their relationship would never work out. After the plane starts to take off, Rachel suddenly orders the plane to stop, jumps out and runs to Frank for one last passionate kiss. Some time later Rachel performs "I Will Always Love You" on a stage, while elsewhere Frank is at an annual dinner keeping a vigilant eye on his next assignment. A minister is seen holding a cross similar to the one he gave Rachel.

Cast

In addition, Tony Pierce plays the stalker, while the Academy Awards ceremony includes Robert Wuhl as the host, Richard Schiff as a stage manager, journalist Chris Connelly as the red carpet M.C. and Debbie Reynolds as herself. David Foster and Linda Thompson also have cameos as the Oscars music director and an audience member respectively.

Production
Lawrence Kasdan was an advertising copywriter who wanted to get into filmmaking. He wrote eight scripts in eight years, including The Bodyguard which Kasdan says was inspired by Yojimbo with Steve McQueen as the lead. "I was interested in what kind of a guy would do that kind of work: to be willing to lay down his life for a salary, for someone he may care nothing about-maybe even have negative feelings about," said Kasdan. Kasdan says it was the first really good script he wrote:
I loved all my early scripts and I expected everybody else to love them. It wasn't until I wrote 'The Bodyguard' and sensed it was different that I realized I was writing an increased level of density. A good script has levels of action going on, unexpected turns. Movies are an economical form. Your script must communicate in the tersest possible way an emotional feeling, imply it in a mosaic of tiny scenes. An unknown screenwriter selling a speculative script must deliver a delight. An established writer gets a lot of rope. The producer reads his script and says, 'I don't feel any delight but he must know what he's doing.' A lot of times he doesn't, and you have a lousy movie.
Kasdan wrote it in 1975 and the script succeeded in getting him an agent, but it took the agent two years to sell the script—he says 67 people passed on it. Eventually the script was sold to John Calley for $20,000. Calley brought in John Boorman to direct. Kasdan admired Boorman and went to Ireland with the director where they did a treatment for a new movie. "He completely changed it, but I still loved him," said Kasdan.

In November 1978, the film was going ahead with Ryan O'Neal and Diana Ross. Then, Ross pulled out of the movie which went back into development hell.

After Kasdan made his successful directorial debut with Body Heat he was asked to direct The Bodyguard but he was reluctant, preferring to make The Big Chill. Kevin Costner read the script when making Silverado with Kasdan and became enthusiastic about it. The two men decided to produce it together. After Costner became a major star with the success of The Untouchables and Robin Hood: Prince of Thieves, among others, he had the clout to make The Bodyguard.

In April 1991, Costner announced that he would star in the film alongside Whitney Houston.

Reception

Critical response
On Rotten Tomatoes, The Bodyguard has a 38% approval rating from 50 reviews and an average rating of 5.2/10. The consensus reads, "The Bodyguard is a cheesy, melodramatic potboiler with occasional moments of electricity from Whitney Houston." On Metacritic the film has a score of 38 out of 100 based on reviews from 20 critics, indicating "generally unfavorable reviews". Audiences surveyed by CinemaScore gave the film a grade of "B+" on scale of A+ to F.

Owen Gleiberman of Entertainment Weekly wrote, "To say that Houston and Costner fail to strike sparks would be putting it mildly." He added that "the movie gives us these two self-contained celebrity icons working hard to look as if they want each other. It's like watching two statues attempting to mate." Roger Ebert gave it three out of four stars and wrote, "The movie does contain a love story, but it's the kind of guarded passion that grows between two people who spend a lot of time keeping their priorities straight."

The film is listed in Golden Raspberry Award founder John Wilson's The Official Razzie Movie Guide as one of The 100 Most Enjoyably Bad Movies Ever Made.

Box office
In the United States and Canada, The Bodyguard opened on November 25, 1992 in 1,717 theaters; it grossed $16.6 million in its opening weekend, ranking third. The film spent 10 weeks in the Top 10, ultimately grossing $121.9 million domestically, and $410.9 million worldwide. Its international gross was a record for Warner Bros. In the United Kingdom, it had a record Christmas opening, with a gross of $2 million for the weekend from 258 screens. In Australia, it set an opening week record of $A4.36 million from 144 screens, beating the record set by Crocodile Dundee II. It also set the opening weekend record in Denmark. It was the highest-grossing Warner Bros. film in Japan of all-time with a gross in excess of $21 million. It was the seventh-highest-grossing film of 1992 in the United States and Canada and the second-highest-grossing film of 1992, worldwide, behind Aladdin, which curiously opened on the same day as The Bodyguard. At the time, it was the tenth-highest-grossing film of all time.

The film was re-released in 2012 and grossed a further $61,020.

Accolades

Two songs from the film, "Run to You" and "I Have Nothing", were nominated for an Academy Award for Best Original Song. The soundtrack was nominated for four Grammy Awards, winning three, including Album of the Year for its album of the same name. The film was nominated for several MTV Movie Awards, an Image Award, BMI Film & TV Awards, a Golden Screen Award in Germany and a Japanese Academy Award, according to the Internet Movie Database.

It received seven Golden Raspberry Award nominations, including Worst Picture, Worst Actor (for Costner), and Worst Actress (for Houston). Houston was also nominated for Worst New Star as was Kevin Costner's haircut, however failed to win in any category.

The film is recognized by American Film Institute in these lists:
 2002: AFI's 100 Years...100 Passions – Nominated
 2004: AFI's 100 Years...100 Songs:
 "I Will Always Love You" – #65

Soundtrack

The Bodyguard: Original Soundtrack Album became the best-selling soundtrack of all time and the best-selling album by a female artist of all time. It has been certified diamond in the United States (sales of at least ten million) with shipments of over 17 million copies. Worldwide, the sales are over 45 million copies. In addition, Houston's cover of "I Will Always Love You" sold over 20 million units worldwide, becoming the best-selling physical single by a female artist of all time.

The soundtrack features five songs which were hit singles for Houston: "I Will Always Love You" (a cover of the Dolly Parton song), "I'm Every Woman" (a cover of the Chaka Khan song), the two Oscar-nominated songs, "I Have Nothing" and "Run to You", and "Queen of the Night".

Other artists who appear on the soundtrack include fellow Arista recording artists Kenny G ("Even if My Heart Would Break", a duet with Aaron Neville), Lisa Stansfield ("Someday I'm Coming Back") and Curtis Stigers ("What's so Funny 'Bout Peace, Love and Understanding"). Also included is a cover of the Bill Withers standard "Lovely Day" by the S.O.U.L. S.Y.S.T.E.M.

In 2013, La-La Land Records released a limited-edition CD (3,500 units) of Alan Silvestri's original score.

Parodies
 The Simpsons – in the episode "Mayored to the Mob", Homer Simpson receives bodyguard training from an instructor who sings "I Will Always Love You" after the class graduates. Also in the episode, Mark Hamill gets carried by Homer in a fashion which parodies the way Costner carries Houston in the film.
 30 Rock – in the episode "Hard Ball", Tracy Jordan is rescued from a mob by his entourage; his character sang "I Will Always Love You" during the scene.
 Bulletproof—a scene in the film parodies The Bodyguard with Adam Sandler's character singing "I Will Always Love You" and remarking that Damon Wayans's character can always be his bodyguard.
 The Venture Bros. – in the second-season episode "I Know Why the Caged Bird Kills", after having fallen in love with her charge, Dr. Venture, bodyguard Myra Brandish says she was taught "Never let them out of your sight. Never let your guard down. Never fall in love", the tag line from the film.
 In Living Color – Kim Wayans plays Grace Jones as the Whitney Houston character and Jim Carrey plays the Kevin Costner character, complete with bad hair. The scene when Kevin Costner carries Whitney Houston off-stage from the original movie is reversed with Grace Jones carrying Frank Farmer off while singing "I Will Always Love You".
 The Hitman's Bodyguard – Teaser trailer featuring Houston's song "I Will Always Love You", and movie poster spoof.
 Family Guy - In the episode "Boopa-dee Bappa-dee" Chris Griffin thought that the American National Anthem is "I Will Always Love You" and sang it in front of the official, to get back American citizenship.

Cancelled sequel
Following the success of the film, Costner contacted his longtime friend, Princess Diana, to star in a sequel. She agreed. The first draft arrived the day before her death. Following her passing, the film was scrapped.

Remake 
In September 2021, it was reported that Matthew Lopez will be writing the remake of the film.

Musical adaptation

A musical adaptation of the film opened in London's Adelphi Theatre in the West End in Fall 2012. David Ian, who produces the musical, received the stage rights from Kevin Costner and Lawrence Kasdan.

References

External links
 
 
 
 
 

1992 films
1992 romantic drama films
American romantic drama films
American romantic thriller films
Films about bodyguards
Films about singers
Films about stalking
Films directed by Mick Jackson
Films scored by Alan Silvestri
Films set in Los Angeles
Films shot in California
Films shot in Florida
Films shot in Los Angeles
Films shot in Miami
Films shot in New Jersey
Warner Bros. films
1990s romantic thriller films
1990s English-language films
1990s American films